Coelosia tenella  is a Palearctic species of  'fungus gnat' in the family Mycetophilidae. It is associated with Stereum.

References

External links 
 Images representing  Coelosia tenella  at BOLD

Mycetophilidae